Mahendran is an Indian actor who works in Tamil and Telugu language films. He started acting at the age of 3 and has appeared in over 100 films in six languages as a child actor, a record in India. He is a recipient of two Nandi Awards and two Tamil Nadu State Film Awards.

In 2013 he played the lead in Vizha, which was his breakthrough as an adult actor.

Career
Mahendran made his debut with K. S. Ravikumar's Nattamai (1994). He twice won the Tamil Nadu State Film Award for Best Child Artist, for Thaikulame Thaikulame (1995) and Kumbakonam Gopalu (1998). He also twice won the Nandi Award for Best Child Actor, for Devi (1999) and Little Hearts (2001). He also appeared on the Sun TV dance show Masthana Masthana as a participant in 2009.

The actor made his breakthrough as a hero when he starred alongside Malavika Menon in Vizha (2013), directed by Barathi Balakumaran.

The film is based on the award-winning short film Uthiri, and portrays the love story of Mahendran's character Sundaram, who plays the thappu instrument at funerals, and Rakkamma (Malavika), an oppari singer. The film opened to positive reviews in December 2013. His first Telugu film, First Love opposite Amrita Rao released on the same day, with a low key release.

Filmography

Tamil films

Telugu films

Malayalam films

References

External links
 

Tamil male actors
Living people
1991 births
Indian male child actors
Indian male film actors
Male actors in Tamil cinema
Male actors in Telugu cinema